Sarah Louise Veatch is an American biophysicist, associate professor of biophysics at University of Michigan.

Early life 
Veatch was raised in Brookline, Massachusetts by her mother, a medical doctor, and her father, William R. Veatch, a membrane biophysicist.

Education 
Veatch's interest in physics began in high school. She was involved in her high school's gay–straight alliance in the mid-1990s "but struggled with her LGBT identity until college". She  earned a B.S. in physics in 1998 from Massachusetts Institute of Technology (MIT).   Her undergraduate thesis was titled VLF magnetic field correlation measurements between LIGO sites. Her thesis supervisor was Rainer Weiss.

Veatch worked for a year as an electrical engineer, programming lighting consoles used in auditoriums. In 2004, she completed her Ph.D. in physics at University of Washington under her advisor Sarah L. Keller, after which she conducted one year of postdoctoral studies with Robert E. W. Hancock at University of British Columbia. She also worked with Jenifer Thewalt at Simon Fraser University. Veatch completed further postdoctoral studies with Barbara A. Baird and David Holowka at Cornell University. Here, she built upon her Ph.D. work, exploring phase separation in isolated biological membranes.

Career 
After her postdoctoral work, Veatch was hired as an Assistant Professor of Biophysics at the University of Michigan, and was promoted to the position of associate professor in May 2017. She researches the physical properties of lipids and the influence on the plasma membrane function. She investigates signalling pathways initiated in the membrane and has developed new super-resolution fluorescence microscopy techniques to further study interactions in the membrane.

Veatch is a Presidential Visiting Fellow of Yale University 2019-2020 where she is working on ion channel function and phase transitions in membranes and polymers alongside Ben Machta.

Awards and honors 
In 2012, Veatch won a Sloan Research Fellowship. In 2014, she was awarded the Margaret Oakley Dayhoff Award "for her substantial contributions to the field of membrane physical chemistry as it translates into biological systems."

References

External links
 

Living people
Year of birth missing (living people)
People from Brookline, Massachusetts
Scientists from Massachusetts
MIT Department of Physics alumni
University of Washington alumni
University of Michigan faculty
Sloan Research Fellows
American biophysicists
Women biophysicists
21st-century American physicists
21st-century American women scientists
American LGBT scientists
LGBT people from Massachusetts
LGBT academics
American women academics